Ujjain Development Authority also known as UDA is the urban planning agency serving Ujjain Division of the Indian state of Madhya Pradesh.  The headquarters of the Ujjain Development Authority is Bharatpuri, Ujjain. It was established in 1973 under Madhya Pradesh Town and Country Planning Act, 1973.

Departments
The authority is divided into twelve departments.
 Engineering
 Finance
 Town planning
 Architecture
 Legal
 Monitoring
 Enforcement
 Vigilance
 Establishment and Authority
 Policy
 Land acquisition
 Information technology

Development Works 

 Infrastructural Development 
 Development of Commercial and Residential Scheme 
 Development and Rehabilitation 
 Preparation and Implementation 
 Environmental Development

Projects 

 Vedic Shodh Sansthan and Gausala at Chitaman
 Madhav Nagar Government Hospital a 100-bedded hospital at Madhav Nagar
 Provident Fund Zonal Training Centre, Mahashweta Nagar
 Provident Fund Office Building, Mahashweta Nagar
 Provident Fund Residential Complex, Mahashweta Nagar
 Nana Kheda Inter State Bus Terminal, Nana Kheda
 Mahakal Dharamshala
 Pravachan Hall
 Ujjain Sport Arena
 Harsiddhi Dharamshala, Harsiddhi
 Kalidasa Akademi
 Mahamritunjay Dwar
 Mahatma Jyotiba Phule Sabji Mandi
 Pt. Surya Narayan Vyas Multicultural Complex
 Dr. Vishnu Shridhar Wakankar Highlevel Bridge
 Planatarium and Antariksha Vihar
 Dongla Observatory
 Maharshi Panini Sanskrit University

See also
 Urban planning

References

External links
 Official website Ujjain Development Authority
 Wikimapia
 Official website of Ujjain Municipal Corporation
 Official website of Ujjain district

Government of Ujjain
State urban development authorities of India
State agencies of Madhya Pradesh
1973 establishments in Madhya Pradesh